James Scott Bruske (born October 7, 1964) is a former Major League Baseball right-handed pitcher for the Los Angeles Dodgers, San Diego Padres, New York Yankees and Milwaukee Brewers from 1995 to 2000. He is currently a real estate agent in Scottsdale, Arizona.

Sources

External links
, or Pelota Binaria

1964 births
Living people
Albuquerque Dukes players
Baseball players from Illinois
Batavia Trojans players
Canton-Akron Indians players
Colorado Springs Sky Sox players
Columbus Clippers players
Indianapolis Indians players
Jackson Generals (Texas League) players
Kinston Indians players
Las Vegas 51s players
Las Vegas Stars (baseball) players
Los Angeles Dodgers players
Loyola Marymount Lions baseball players
Major League Baseball pitchers
Milwaukee Brewers players
Navegantes del Magallanes players
American expatriate baseball players in Venezuela
New York Yankees players
People from East St. Louis, Illinois
Baseball players from Scottsdale, Arizona
Salt Lake Stingers players
San Diego Padres players
Tigres de Aragua players
Tucson Toros players
Williamsport Bills players
Antelope Valley Marauders baseball players
Mat-Su Miners players